Missouri state elections were held on November 8, 2022, and the primary election were held on August 2, 2022.

Missouri voters elected their Class 3 US Senator, State Auditor, all of the seats for the House of Representatives, all of the seats of the Missouri House of Representatives, and 17 of 34 seats in the Missouri State Senate. The two statewide officer holders, Roy Blunt and Nicole Galloway, did not run for re-election leaving both statewide seats with no incumbents. Two of the seats for the House of Representatives were open as incumbent Vicky Hartzler and Billy Long both ran unsuccessfully for the open Senate seat.

Federal offices

US Senate

United States House of Representatives 

All eight U.S. representatives in Missouri who were up for election.

Auditor

State Legislature 
All 163 seats of the Missouri House of Representatives and 17 of 34 seats of the Missouri State Senate were up for election. Before the election, the composition of the Missouri State Legislature was:

State Senate

House of Representatives

After the election, the composition of the Missouri State Legislature was:

State Senate

House of Representatives

Polling
Senate District 2
Republican primary

Senate District 10
Republican primary

Senate District 12
Republican primary

Senate District 16
Republican primary

Senate District 20
Republican primary

Senate District 22
Republican primary

Senate District 24
General election

Senate District 26
Republican primary

Ballot measures
There was four amendments as well as a question to rewrite the state constitution on the ballot in November. Amendment 1 changes how the State Treasurer of Missouri is allowed to invest taxpayer money. Amendment 3 legalizes cannabis and allows expungement of convictions while also allowing judges to deny the expungement for "good cause". Amendment 4 makes an exception to the Hancock Amendment to allow the increase of required spending for the Kansas City Police put in place by SB 678. Amendment 5 makes the Missouri National Guard its own department and renames it to Missouri Department of the National Guard.

Notes 

Partisan clients

References 

 
Missouri